

Xeon (UP/DP)

"Foster" (180 nm) 
 Based on NetBurst microarchitecture
 All models support: MMX, SSE, SSE2

"Prestonia" (130 nm) 
 Based on NetBurst microarchitecture
 All models support: MMX, SSE, SSE2, Hyper-Threading

"Gallatin" (130 nm) 
 Based on NetBurst microarchitecture
 All models support: MMX, SSE, SSE2, Hyper-Threading

"Nocona" (90 nm) 
 Based on NetBurst microarchitecture
 All models support: MMX, SSE, SSE2, SSE3, Hyper-Threading, Intel 64
 Steppings: D0, E0, F1, G1

"Irwindale" (90 nm) 
 Based on NetBurst microarchitecture
 All models support: MMX, SSE, SSE2, SSE3, Hyper-Threading, EIST, XD bit (an NX bit implementation) and Intel 64.
 Steppings: N0, R0

Xeon (UP/DP), Dual Core

"Paxville DP" (90 nm) 
 Based on NetBurst microarchitecture
 All models support: MMX, SSE, SSE2, SSE3, Hyper-Threading, Intel 64, XD bit (an NX bit implementation)
 Steppings: A0

"Dempsey" (65 nm) 
 Based on NetBurst microarchitecture
 All models support: MMX, SSE, SSE2, SSE3, Hyper-Threading, Intel 64, XD bit (an NX bit implementation), Intel VT-x
 All models support dual-processor configurations
 Die size: 2× 81 mm²
 Demand Based Switching (Intel's Server EIST): Supported by: All except 5060, 5063.
 Steppings: C1

Xeon MP

"Foster MP" (180 nm) 
 Based on NetBurst microarchitecture
 All models support: MMX, SSE, SSE2, Hyper-Threading

"Gallatin" (130 nm) 
 Based on NetBurst microarchitecture
 All models support: MMX, SSE, SSE2, Hyper-Threading

"Cranford" (90 nm) 
 Based on NetBurst microarchitecture
 All models support: MMX, SSE, SSE2, SSE3, Hyper-Threading, Intel 64, XD bit (an NX bit implementation)
 Steppings: A0, B0

"Potomac" (90 nm) 
 Based on NetBurst microarchitecture
 All models support: MMX, SSE, SSE2, SSE3, Hyper-Threading, Intel 64, XD bit (an NX bit implementation)
 Steppings: C0

Xeon MP, Dual Core

"Paxville MP" (90 nm) 
 Based on NetBurst microarchitecture
 All models support: MMX, SSE, SSE2, SSE3, Hyper-Threading, Intel 64, XD bit (an NX bit implementation), Intel VT-x
 Demand Based Switching (Intel's Server EIST): All except 7030.
 Steppings: A0

"Tulsa" (65 nm) 
 Based on NetBurst microarchitecture
 All models support: MMX, SSE, SSE2, SSE3, Hyper-Threading, Intel 64, XD bit (an NX bit implementation), Intel VT-x
 All models support quad-processor and octo-processor configurations
 Demand Based Switching (Intel's Server EIST): Supported by: All except 7110M/N & 7120M/N.
 Die size: 435 mm²
 Steppings: B0

References 

Intel Xeon (NetBurst)